Matthew Bullock (born 1 November 1980) is an English former footballer who played in the Football League for Macclesfield Town and Stoke City.

Career
Bullock joined Stoke as a trainee from non-league Stone Dominoes and was made a member of the first team squad in 1999–2000. He made his debut away at Bournemouth in a 1–1 draw and went on to make a further six appearances for Stoke. During the middle of the season he suffered an ACL injury.  After spending the start of the next season in the reserves he left for Macclesfield Town on loan. He played three matches for the "Silkmen" and joined non-league Leek Town in 2002.

Career statistics
Source:

References

External links
 

1980 births
Living people
Footballers from Stoke-on-Trent
English footballers
Association football midfielders
Stone Dominoes F.C. players
Stoke City F.C. players
Macclesfield Town F.C. players
Leek Town F.C. players
English Football League players